HD 50554 b is a Jupiter-sized extrasolar planet with minimum mass 4.4 times that of Jupiter. The planet was announced in 2001 by the European Southern Observatory and confirmed in 2002 using observations from the Lick and Keck telescopes.

See also 
 HD 50499 b

References

External links 
 

Gemini (constellation)
Giant planets
Exoplanets discovered in 2001
Exoplanets detected by radial velocity

de:HD 50554 b